Alucita euscripta is a species of moth of the family Alucitidae. It is known from Madagascar.

References
Minet, J. 1976. Contribution à l'étude des Microlépidoptères de Madagascar [Sesiidae, Alucitidae]. - Bulletin de la Société entomologique de France 81(1–2):40–43.

Alucitidae
Moths described in 1976
Moths of Madagascar
Moths of Africa